Balemba is a town in the Manni Department of Gnagna Province in eastern Burkina Faso. The town has a population of 1,767.

Other
Balemba may also refer to two placenames in Gabon, or to an ethnic group in Katanga.

References

Populated places in the Est Region (Burkina Faso)
Gnagna Province